HMS Corunna (D97) was a later or 1943  fleet destroyer of the Royal Navy. She was named in honour of the Battle of Corunna, which took place during the Peninsular War in 1809 between British and French forces. Corunna was built by Swan Hunter & Wigham Richardson Limited on the Tyne. She was launched on 29 May 1945 and commissioned on 6 June 1947.

Design and construction
The Battle-class was developed as a result of operational experience in the early years of the Second World War, which had shown that the Royal Navy's existing destroyers had inadequate anti-aircraft protection, and in particular, lacked a modern dual-purpose main gun armament, capable of dealing with both surface targets and air attack, with guns lacking the high elevation mountings necessary to deal with dive bombers. The resulting design was armed with two twin 4.5 inch high-angle gun-turrets of a new design mounted forward and a heavy close-in anti-aircraft armament, with 16 Battle-class destroyers ordered under the 1942 construction programme.

For the 1943 construction programme, 24 Battle-class destroyers of a revised design (known as "1943 Battles") were ordered, with three destroyers (Corunna, Oudenarde and River Plate) to be built by Swan Hunter.

Displacement was  standard and  full load.

Two twin 4.5 inch (113 mm) Mark IV gun mounts, capable of elevating to 85 degrees, were mounted forward, while a single 4.5 inch gun, elevating to 55 degrees was fitted behind the funnel - this fifth gun , which could fire astern, replaced a 4-inch gun fitted to the 1942 Battles used for firing Star shell and could be controlled by the main fire control system. Close-in anti-aircraft armament was eight Bofors 40 mm gun, with two twin stabilised STAAG mounts, with integrated fire control, aft, one simple Mark V twin mount amidships, and two single mounts on the bridge wings. Two quintuple 21 inch (533 mm) torpedo-tubes were fitted, with a Squid anti-submarine mortar aft.

Corunna, named after the 1809 Battle of Corunna, was one of thirteen 1943 Battles ordered on 23 April 1943. The destroyer was laid down at Swan Hunter's Tyneside shipyard on 12 April 1944, was launched on 29 May 1945. The end of the Second World War in August 1945 resulted in the decision to cancel 16 of the 1943 Battles, with construction of the remaining ships slowed. Corunna was commissioned on 23 May 1947, and was completed on 6 June 1947.

Service
On commissioning, Corunna joined the 4th Destroyer Flotilla, part of the Home Fleet, but was temporarily laid up in reserve for several months from October 1947 owing to a manning crisis in the Royal Navy. On 8 December 1948 Corunna was in collision with the oiler  while being refuelled, and was under repair at Chatham from 16 December to 18 February 1949. In 1953 she took part in the Fleet Review to celebrate the Coronation of Queen Elizabeth II. In 1954, Corunna, with the rest of the Squadron, formerly Flotilla, deployed to the Mediterranean, remaining there until 1955.  Corunna, with the rest of the Squadron, returned to the region in 1956 and took part in the Suez Crisis. On 15 March 1959, Corunna accidentally collided with her sister ship  in the Bay Of Biscay.

Corunna subsequently began her conversion to a Radar Picket, of which three other ships were also converted. The conversion included new Anti-Aircraft weaponry, new radar, and the addition of the Sea Cat missile system. In 1962, Corunna joined the 7th Destroyer Squadron, based in the Mediterranean, and the following year joined the 21st Escort Squadron.

In 1964, Corunna deployed, along with the rest of the Squadron, to the Far East, where she would remain until 1965.

Decommissioning and fate
In 1967, Corunna was placed in reserve and was put on the disposal list in 1972. On Friday 17 January 1975 "Corunna" was photographed alongside the partially demolished D86 HMS Agincourt at Sunderland. In 1975, Corunna arrived at Blyth in Northumberland where she was subsequently broken up.

References

Publications
 
 
 
 
 
 
 
 

 

Battle-class destroyers of the Royal Navy
Ships built by Swan Hunter
Ships built on the River Tyne
1945 ships
Cold War destroyers of the United Kingdom